The United States Senate election of 1932 in New York was held on November 8, 1932. Incumbent Democratic Senator Robert F. Wagner was re-elected to a second term over Republican George Z. Medalie.

General election

Candidates
 D. Leigh Colvin, perennial candidate (Law Preservation)
 Jeremiah D. Crowley, nominee for Vice President in 1928 (Socialist Labor)
 George Z. Medalie, U.S. Attorney for the Southern District of New York (Republican)
 Charles Solomon, former State Assemblyman (Socialist)
 Robert F. Wagner, incumbent Senator (Democratic)
 William Weinstone, labor leader (Communist)

Results

References

1932
New York
1932 New York (state) elections